The Workers' Party of South Korea was a communist party in South Korea from 1946 to 1949. It was founded on 23 November 1946 through the merger of the Communist Party of South Korea, New People's Party of Korea and a faction of the People's Party of Korea (the so-called 'forty-eighters'). It was led by Ho Hon. 

The party was outlawed by the U.S. occupation authorities due to the party being an aggravating opposition to South Korea and the US, but the party organized a network of clandestine cells and was able to obtain a considerable following. It had around 360,000 party members. In 1947, the party initiated armed guerrilla struggle. As the persecution of party intensified, large sections of the party leadership moved to Pyongyang.

The party was opposed to the formation of a South Korean state. In February–March 1948, it instigated general strikes in opposition to the plans to create a separate South Korean state. On 3 April 1948, the party led a popular uprising on Jeju island, against the unilateral declaration of the foundation of the Republic of Korea. In the suppression of the revolt, thousands of islanders were killed (see Jeju massacre), largely by forces of the South Korean Government.

In one of its first official acts, the South Korean National Assembly passed the National Security Act in September 1948, which among other measures, outlawed the Workers' Party of South Korea.

On 24 June 1949, the party merged with the Workers' Party of North Korea, forming the Workers' Party of Korea. The WPNK leader Kim Il-sung became party chairman, whereas Pak Hon-yong became deputy chairman. 

In the Korean War, members of the party and people suspicious of being a communist supporter were massacred by the South Korean Army with supervision of the US army in what became known as the Bodo League massacre with up to 200,000 people.

Pak Hon-yong and other leaders of WPSK in North Korea were later purged. 

The clandestine trade union movement, the All Korea Labor Union (Chŏnp'yŏng) was connected to the party.

References

Banned communist parties
Banned political parties in South Korea
Defunct political parties in South Korea
Workers' Party of South Korea
Defunct communist parties
Far-left politics in South Korea
History of the Workers' Party of Korea
Political parties established in 1946